LaMarcus is a given name. Notable people with the name include:

LaMarcus Adna Thompson (1848–1919), American inventor and businessman
LaMarcus Aldridge (born 1985), American basketball player
LaMarcus Coker (born 1986), American football player
LaMarcus Hicks (born 1983), American football player
Lamarcus Joyner (born 1990), American football player
LaMarcus McDonald (born 1981), American football player
LaMarcus Tinker, American actor

See also
LeMarcus